KJCN-LP was a low-power television station in Paso Robles, California, broadcasting locally in analog on UHF channel 36 as an affiliate of TBN. Founded October 26, 1984, the station was owned by Central Coast Good News, Inc. KJCN extended its signal throughout the California Central Coast via three low-power translator stations: K22EE Morro Bay, K23CL Lompoc, and K51GB Santa Maria.

KJCN-LP's license, and those of its translators, were cancelled by the Federal Communications Commission on March 19, 2015, for failure to file license renewal applications.

External links
TBN official site

Defunct television stations in the United States
Paso Robles, California
Mass media in San Luis Obispo County, California
Religious television stations in the United States
JCN-LP
Television channels and stations established in 1984
Television channels and stations disestablished in 2015
1984 establishments in California
2015 disestablishments in California
Trinity Broadcasting Network affiliates
JCN-LP